Caseolus hartungi is a species of small air-breathing land snails, terrestrial pulmonate gastropod mollusks in the family Geomitridae.

This species is endemic to Porto Santo, Portugal.

References

Endemic fauna of Madeira
Molluscs of Europe
hartungi
Gastropods described in 1852
Taxonomy articles created by Polbot